Parapediasia ligonellus is a moth in the family Crambidae. It was described by Zeller in 1881. It is found in Jamaica, Cuba and Puerto Rico. It is also found in southern Florida.

The wingspan is about 17 mm.

References 

Crambini
Moths described in 1881
Moths of North America